Van Roekel or VanRoekel is a toponymic surname of Dutch origin, meaning "from Roekel". Notable people with the surname include:

Dennis Van Roekel, president of the National Education Association
Steven VanRoekel, American civil servant
Steven J. VanRoekel, American Agricultural Businessman 
 
Fictional characters:
Niles Van Roekel, Marvel Comics villain

Dutch-language surnames
Surnames of Dutch origin